REVA University is a private university in Kattigenahalli, Yelahanka, Bangalore. It was established under the Government of Karnataka Act, 2012. It is managed by the Rukmini Educational Charitable Trust. The university currently offers UG, PG and several certificate/diploma level programs in engineering, architecture, science & technology, commerce, management, law, & arts. The university also facilitates research leading to doctoral degrees in all disciplines. Dr. P. Shyama Raju is chancellor of the university. Reva University has been given a B+ grade by NAAC and is valid until 17th January 2027.

History 
REVA Group of Institutions was established in the year 2004 by Rukmini Educational Charitable Trust, a unit of DivyaSree Group.

Campus 
The university campus is spread over  that houses many multi-department, an incubation center for the start-ups, hostel and medical facilities. Over 18,000 students study different courses.

Academics 
The university is organized into the following schools

Faculty of Engineering and Technology
School of Computer Science and Engineering
School of Computing and Information Technology
School of Electrical and Electronics Engineering
School of Electronics and Communication Engineering
School of Mechanical Engineering
School of Multidisciplinary Studies
School of Civil Engineering
Faculty of Architecture
School of Architecture
Faculty of Commerce and Management Studies
School of Commerce
School of Management Studies
REVA Business School
Faculty of Arts, Humanities and Social Sciences
School of Arts, Humanities and Social Sciences
Faculty of Science and Technology
School of Computer Science and Applications
School of Applied Sciences
School of Allied Health Sciences
Faculty of Law
School of Legal Studies
Faculty of Performing Arts and Indic Studies
School of Performing Arts and Indic Studies

Awards 

Awarded the most preferred university providing global environment to international Students at Global Indian Business Excellence Awards, UK. LEED INDIA NC PLATINUM 2013 Certification IGBC for the Administrative Building of the university. https://www.reva.edu.in/awards
All India Technical and Management Council Honors REVA University, as a Leading University in Skill Development and Placement – 2015.
Vmware awards REVA University the status of Vmware IT Academy in recognition of successful completion of all program participation requirements – 2015.
 EMC2  Academic Leader Awards 2015
 EMC2  Academic Game Changer Awards 2015
 REVA University received the award of Asia's Most Trusted Engineering College by Asia's Most Trusted Brand 2016 (As per Consumer Survey Report 2016 by MRG) - 2017
 Recognition by Economic Times as a “Promising Upcoming Private University in the country” – 2017
 Recognition by The Hindu as "The Doyens”, Guardian of Knowledge – 2017
 Vmware IT academy recognized as partner Excellence Award – 2017
 REVA University's grand staircase featured in Bentley's 2017 Year Book as an Engineering Marvel – 2017
 REVA University was honored with “Leadership Award in Higher Education” at ASSOCHAM Leadership Award 2017 on 31st Oct 2017.
 REVA University was awarded “Social Media Innovation Award” by ASMA Academia for outstanding contribution towards the use of Social media tools in academic endeavors – 2017
 REVA University won sixth place in Swachh Campus Award 2018 by MHRD under Higher Education Institutions cross country in the university (Residential) Category
 REVA University was awarded the Most Promising University by Global India Education Forum, 2018 along with EPSI in Geneva!
 REVA University was awarded the Best University in India in Higher Education for Engineering and Management, 2019 by Jagran Josh
 REVA University topped tenth Position in Nation-wide Swachh Campus Ranking 2019 by Ministry of Human Resource Development, Government of India
 REVA University was awarded the Asia's 100 Greatest Brands and Leaders Award, 2018 by Asia One Magazine and URS Media  in Asia – India Singapore Business & Social Forum 2019

Publications / journals / newsletter 
 Insight Newsletter – quarterly 
 Criya Magazine – quarterly 
 FACES Magazine – annual 
 Reflections – annual

Books 
 Book titled “Revisiting Mythologies, Rethinking women” by Dr. G Beena, Associate Dean, School of Arts & Humanities
 Book titled “The Nagas : Social and Cultural Identity - Texts and Contexts” by Dr. Payel Dutta Chowdhury, Director – School of Arts & Humanities
 Book titled “The women of phoolbari and other short stories” by Dr. Payel Dutta Chowdhury, Director – School of Arts & Humanities
 Book titled “Engineering Drawing” by Dr. K S Narayanaswamy, Director – School of Mechanical Engineering & Dr. L Mahesh, Associate Professor, School of Mechanical Engineering
 Book titled "Communication Protocol Engineering" by Pallapa Venkataram, Sunilkumar S Manvi (Dean-Faculty of Engineering), B Satish Babu, PHI,2010.
 Book titled "Computer Concepts and C Programming-A Holistic Approach to learning C, B S Anami, S A Angadi, Sunilkumar S Manvi (Dean-Faculty of Engineering), PHI, 2010.
 Book titled "Wireless and Mobile Networks", Sunilkumar S Manvi (Dean-Faculty of Engineering),Mahabaleshwar Kakasgeri,Wiley India, 2014.
 Book titled "Cloud Computing Concepts and Protocols", Sunilkumar S Manvi (Dean-Faculty of Engineering),Gopal Krishna Shyam, CRC press, 2021.
 Book titled "Programming with R",S R Manishekar, Jagadish, Srinivas, Sunilkumar S Manvi (Dean-Faculty of Engineering), CENGAGE, 2018.
 Book titled "Computer Networks",Sunilkumar S Manvi (Dean-Faculty of Engineering), Narosa, 2009.

Ranking 
 REVA University ranked Gold in QS I∙GAUGE rating.
 REVA has been ranked 111th in All India, 92nd in Private All India, 31st in South Zone, 27th in Private South Zone, 10th in Bengaluru, and 9th in Private Bengaluru by The Week Best B-School 2019 survey.
REVA has been ranked 9th in Bengaluru, City-wise Toppers, and 135th in India among B-Schools as per India Today B-School 2019 rankings
 Ranked 48 in top 50 B-Schools by Chronicle India Survey 2019. A graded institute in Karnataka as per the survey by Chronicle India Survey 2019.
 REVA University was ranked 18th among engineering institutes by the Times Engineering Survey in 2020.
 Ranked 14th in the Outlook-ICARE India University Rankings 2019: Top 25 Young Universities.
 Ranked tenth among private engineering institutes by the Times Engineering Survey in 2020.
 Ranked tenth among private engineering institutes by the Times Engineering Survey in 2020.
 REVA University ranked 30th position in the country in the India's Top 50 Engineering Colleges Survey 2020 published by The ACADEMIC INSIGHTS.
REVA has been ranked 43rd among the Top 50 Private Engineering Institutes in India (2020) by Jagran Josh Engineering.
REVA has been ranked 29th Best Technical School - Countrywide (Engineering) and 20th among Private Universities by Dataquest Engineering.
REVA has been ranked 66th in All India (Multi-Disciplinary Universities), 28th in All India (Private & Deemed Multidisciplinary Universities), 23rd in South Zone (Multi-Disciplinary Universities), 10th in South Zone (Private & Deemed Multidisciplinary Universities) by The Week 2020 University Ranking.
 Ranked 6th Among all the Private Universities of Karnataka and 47th Among all the Private Universities of India by QS Asian University Rankings 2023.
 Ranked 7th in Bengaluru City, 23rd in South Zone, 66th in Private Schools Pan India and 92nd in Pan India by FORTUNE India's Best B-Schools 2023.
 Ranked 13th among Private Universities at the National Level, 8th in South West Zone and 53rd in National Level(Technical HEIs) by Institutional Innovation Council.
 REVA University has been listed under the Diamond Band: Institute of Excellence in the India Academia Rankings for the year 2022-23.
 According to OPEN Magazine Best B-Schools 2022 rankings REVA has been ranked 18th in South Zone and 8th in State wise list  under the Private University category.
 REVA Business School has secured the 49th position in India and 16th position in South Zone in the IIRF Top B Schools (Private Sector) ranking list for 2022-23.
 IIRF 2023 rankings for Private Universities category (Deemed and State -Architecture and Legal Studies) 
REVA University has been ranked at:                                                  
School of Architecture: Ranked 17th in the country and 5th in Karnataka 
School of Legal Studies: Ranked 18th in the country and 4th in Karnataka

References

External links 
 

Private universities in India
2012 establishments in Karnataka
Educational institutions established in 2012
REVA University